Wylie  (c. 1825 – ?) was  an indigenous Australian originally from the King George Sound tribe around Albany in Western Australia. He accompanied Edward John Eyre to Adelaide by sea in May 1840, and would have left with Eyre on his expedition to penetrate to the interior in June of the same year, but Wylie was ill. Later in the year, Eyre was at Fowlers Bay in the west, having retreated from the north, and Wylie joined him by way of the ship supplying the expedition, the Hero.

Wylie was subsequently one of the three aborigines to accompany Eyre and John Baxter on their final attempt to cross the Nullarbor Plain in 1841. He deserted for a brief time with the other older aboriginal member of the party, Joey, while the party rested at the sandhills of present-day Eucla, but they returned when they failed to find any food. Several weeks later he proved loyal to Eyre when Joey and Yarry (the other aboriginal person) murdered Baxter and deserted. Despite the two aborigines accosting them and calling for Wylie to join them the following day, Wylie stayed with Eyre for the rest of the journey, impressing the French whalers they met in Rossiter Bay with his voracious appetite.

Joey and Yarry had been taken on by Eyre at Gundagai and Yarry have been the same person as Yarri or Yarree, who saved a large number of Gundagai citizens during the flood of 25 June 1852 and was accused of at least one subsequent murder.

After the completion of the journey, Wylie remained at Albany. He spent a brief time as a native policeman, and also benefited from a government pension procured for him by Eyre, who remained in contact with him for some years afterward.

References

External links 
 Wylie: Edward Eyre's companion at SAmemory.sa.gov.au (with portrait of Wylie)

Explorers of South Australia
Indigenous Australians from Western Australia
19th-century Australian people